Megarafonus is a genus of ant-loving beetles in the family Staphylinidae. There are about seven described species in Megarafonus.

Species
These seven species belong to the genus Megarafonus:
 Megarafonus haigi Chandler, 2003
 Megarafonus lajuneae Chandler, 2003
 Megarafonus lentus Schuster & Marsh, 1958
 Megarafonus mancus Schuster & Marsh, 1958
 Megarafonus parvus Schuster & Marsh, 1958
 Megarafonus ventralis Casey, 1897
 Megarafonus yahiorum (Chandler, 1983)

References

Further reading

 
 

Pselaphinae
Articles created by Qbugbot